The men's 100 metre freestyle event at the 2018 Commonwealth Games was held on 7 and 8 April at the Gold Coast Aquatic Centre.

Records
Prior to this competition, the existing world, Commonwealth and Games records were as follows:

Results

Heats
The heats were held on 7 April at 11:37.

Semifinals
The semifinals were held on 7 April at 20:59.

Semifinal 1

Semifinal 2

Final
The final was held on 8 April at 19:43.

References

Men's 100 metre freestyle
Commonwealth Games